Dick Logan may refer to:
 Dick Logan (American football player)
 Dick Logan (American football coach)
 Dick Logan (Australian footballer)

See also
 Richard Logan (disambiguation)